Porter Township is the name of some places in the U.S. state of Pennsylvania:

Porter Township, Clarion County, Pennsylvania
Porter Township, Clinton County, Pennsylvania
Porter Township, Huntingdon County, Pennsylvania
Porter Township, Jefferson County, Pennsylvania
Porter Township, Lycoming County, Pennsylvania
Porter Township, Pike County, Pennsylvania
Porter Township, Schuylkill County, Pennsylvania

Pennsylvania township disambiguation pages